The 1852 United States presidential election in Indiana took place on November 2, 1852, as part of the 1852 United States presidential election. Voters chose 13 representatives, or electors to the Electoral College, who voted for President and Vice President.

Indiana voted for the Democratic candidate, Franklin Pierce, over Whig candidate Winfield Scott. Pierce won Illinois by a margin of 7.88%. This would be the last occasion Porter County voted for a Democratic presidential candidate until Bill Clinton won a plurality in 1996.

Results

See also
 United States presidential elections in Indiana

References

Indiana
1852
1852 Indiana elections